St Mary's School, Cambridge, England, is a private Christian school run in the Catholic tradition, offering day and boarding provision for girls aged three to eighteen. The school occupies two sites within walking distance of Cambridge city centre, close to the University Botanic Gardens, with sports fields a short distance away. There are approximately 160 junior school pupils, 400 senior school pupils and 100 sixth-form students.

History
St Mary's School, Cambridge, was founded 1898 by the Sisters of Mary Ward and the Institute of the Blessed Virgin Mary, who had also founded a school of the same name in Ascot, Berkshire 13 years earlier. The sisters started out with two day girls and two day boarders. In 1904 the swelling numbers necessitated a change of venue and 'The Elms' on Bateman Street was purchased for £6,000. The house had a tradition that was very much in keeping with Mary Ward's vision. It had previously belonged to Benjamin Hall Kennedy, former Regius Professor of Greek at Cambridge University. As the school continued to grow, other premises were added. Paston House was purchased in 1909.

The junior school was part of St Mary's School, Cambridge, until it closed in 1987, when it reopened as St Catherine's Prep School and was governed by a group of parents who became the board of directors. In 2007 St Catherine's became St Mary's School, Cambridge's junior section. Both schools are governed by a single board.

The school sees the 17th-century nun Mary Ward as a role model for pupils because of her radical vision for social justice, in the form of education for girls in the sixteenth century. It aims to give the girls self-belief and confidence, able to cope with set-backs in life (as experienced by Mary Ward) alongside an academic education. The girls are trained to have supportive and trusted networks of friends, as experienced by Mary Ward. The hope is that they will make a positive difference to society after they leave school.

Boarding
The school offers a full, weekly or flexi boarding programme for years 7 to upper sixth. Approximately 20% of senior school pupils board. In 2016 the school purchased a new dedicated boarding house on Brooklands Avenue, Mary Ward House, to replace the two buildings previously used: Bateman House for sixth formers and 'The Elms' for girls from years 7–11.

Old girls
Former pupils are known as Pastonians, named after Paston House.
Emerald O'Hanrahan, actress
Maisie Ward, writer and publisher

References

External links
School Website
Profile on the ISC website
2010 ISI Inspection Report (Senior School)
Ofsted Social Care Inspection Reports
ISI Inspection Reports

Roman Catholic private schools in the Diocese of East Anglia
Catholic boarding schools in England
1898 establishments in England
Girls' schools in Cambridgeshire
Boarding schools in Cambridgeshire
Private schools in Cambridgeshire
Member schools of the Girls' Schools Association
Educational institutions established in 1898
Schools in Cambridge
Sisters of Loreto schools
Catholic Church in Cambridge